Fernando Afán de Ribera y Téllez-Girón (10 May 1583 in Sevilla – 28 March 1637 in Villach) was a Spanish noble and diplomat.

Biography
He was the 3rd Duke of Alcalá de los Gazules, 8th Count of los Molares and 5th Marquis of Tarifa. His father was Fernando Enríquez de Ribera y Cortés, 4th Marquis de Tarifa and his mother Ana Téllez-Girón, daughter of Pedro Téllez-Girón, 1st Duke of Osuna.

He was ambassador to the Holy See and vicar general of Italy during the reign of Pope Urban VIII. He was also successively viceroy of Catalonia, Naples, Sicily and Governor of Milan.

A lover of art and literature, he was a patron of several artists, including Jusepe de Ribera and Artemisia Gentileschi, and he gathered an impressive art collection in his Sevillian residence, the casa de Pilatos.

He died in 1637 in Villach, on his way to Cologne on a diplomatic mission, sent by King  Philip IV of Spain as Plenipotentiary to negotiate an end to the Thirty Years' War. His remains were returned to Spain and buried in the Monastery of Santa Maria de las Cuevas.

Family
He married Beatriz de Moura, daughter of Cristóbal de Moura and had 5 children :
 Fernando Enríquez (1614–1633), 6th Marquis of Tarifa, married Ana de Mendoza Sandoval, no issue.
 Margarita Enríquez, died young.
 María Enríquez (died 1639), 4th Duchess of Alcalá de los Gazules, 7th Marqueses of Tarifa, married Luis Guillermo de Moncada, 7th Duke of Montalto, no issue.
 Ana Girón Enríquez de Ribera, married Pedro Fajardo de Zúñiga y Requesens, no issue.
 Fernando Enríquez de Ribera.

He also had several illegitimate children, including 
 Payo Enríquez de Rivera, who became Archbishop of Mexico and viceroy of New Spain.

References
The Duke of Alcalá: His Collection and Its Evolution; Jonathan Brown, Richard L. Kagan, Jun. 1987, The Art Bulletin, Vol. 69, No. 2 (Jun., 1987), pp. 231–255; Published by: College Art Association.
Grandes de España.
Fundación Medinaceli.

Viceroys of Sicily
Viceroys of Naples
Viceroys of Catalonia
Governors of the Duchy of Milan
1583 births
1637 deaths
Dukes of Spain